Brigadier General Mihiel "Mike" Gilormini Pacheco (August 3, 1918 – January 29, 1988) was a United States Air Force officer who served in the Royal Air Force and in the United States Army Air Forces during World War II. He was the recipient of the Silver Star, the Air Medal with four clusters and the Distinguished Flying Cross 5 times. He was also a co-founder of the Puerto Rico Air National Guard.

Early years
Gilormini (birth name: Mihiel Gilormini Pacheco)  was born to Domingo Gilormini and Petronila Pacheco de Gilormini in the town of Yauco, Puerto Rico. The town of Yauco, where he was raised and where he received his primary education, is located in the southwestern region of the island. Gilormini, graduated from the Escuela Superior de Yauco (Yauco High School) and in the early 1940s, moved to San Diego, California where he took private flying lessons, earning his pilot's license in 1941. On November 23, 1941, he enlisted in the Royal Canadian Air Force with the rank of sergeant pilot.

World War II

Upon the outbreak of World War II, Gilormini offered his services to the Royal Air Force and served with them. As a member of the RAF, he flew in a squadron of P-39s from England to North Africa and participated in the Allied invasion of Oran. He served with the RAF until November 30, 1942, when he joined the United States Army Air Forces with the rank of second lieutenant. In October 1942, he was assigned to the 346th Fighter Squadron and flew the Bell P-39 Airacobra interceptor. In March 1943, he was transferred to the 345th Fighter Squadron of the 350th Fighter Group in North Africa and Italy, to replace pilot losses. He stayed with the 345th "Devil Hawks" and flew a Republic P-47 Thunderbolt until February 1945. On one occasion Gilormini led a squadron in an attack against Nazi positions in Conneto, Italy. During the  attack his P-47 was struck by enemy anti-aircraft fire. Gilormini made a nose dive which put out the flames consuming his aircraft and rejoined his squadron. His squadron destroyed a strategic railroad and vehicles which were transporting military equipment.

During the war he was promoted to captain and flew a total of 200 combat missions over England, North Africa, Corsica and Italy. On May 19, 1943, Gilormini was involved in an aircraft accident when his P-39 went down over Maison Blanche, Algiers.

In an interview, Colonel Earl Miller, a former buddy and roommate of Gilormini, recalled the following: 

In 1945, Gilormini was awarded the Silver Star, G.O. (General Order) #27, for "Conspicuous Gallantry in Action" for his actions during the Conneto, Italy mission, while assigned to HQ, 12th Air Force . Gilormini and Miller flew their last flight in Italy together giving air cover for General George C. Marshall's visit to their group at Pisa. They both returned to the United States on the same ship. Gilormini was also the recipient of five Distinguished Flying Crosses. The Distinguished Flying Cross is a medal awarded to any officer or enlisted member of the United States armed forces who distinguishes himself or herself in combat in support of operations by "heroism" or extraordinary achievement while participating in an aerial flight. Also, in 1945, Puerto Rican poet Francisco Rojas Tollinchi paid  homage to Gilormini in his poem "Recuerdo yaucano" (Remembrance of a Yaucano).

Post World War II

After the war he continued to serve in the Army Air Force. In 1947, he was reassigned to the newly formed United States Air Force and named base commander to the 198th Fighter Squadron in Puerto Rico. On November 23, 1947, the Puerto Rico Air National Guard came into existence as a result of the efforts led by Colonel Mihiel Gilormini, Colonel Alberto A. Nido and Lieutenant Colonel José Antonio Muñiz. Gilormini was promoted to brigadier general and served as commander until his retirement from the military in 1975. On January 29, 1988, Brigadier General Mihiel "Mike" Gilormini died in San Juan, Puerto Rico, and was buried with full military honors in Puerto Rico National Cemetery located in Bayamón, Puerto Rico.

Awards and decorations
Among Gilormini's awards and decorations were the following:

Awards:

Badges:
  RAF Pilot Wings
  WW II Army Air Force Pilot Badge

See also

List of Puerto Ricans
List of Puerto Rican military personnel
Puerto Ricans in World War II
Corsican immigration to Puerto Rico
Hispanics in the United States Air Force
Puerto Rico Air National Guard

Notes

References

Further reading

Boudock, Greg. Puertorriquenos Who Served With Guts, Glory, and Honor. Fighting to Defend a Nation Not Completely Their Own. ; 
Negroni, Héctor Andrés. Historia Militar de Puerto Rico (A Military History of Puerto Rico). Turner Publishing, 1992. 536 pp. 

1918 births
1988 deaths
Puerto Rican United States Air Force personnel
Royal Canadian Air Force personnel
Royal Air Force personnel of World War II
United States Air Force generals
Recipients of the Distinguished Flying Cross (United States)
Recipients of the Silver Star
Puerto Rican military officers
People from Yauco, Puerto Rico
Puerto Rican people of Corsican descent
Recipients of the Air Medal
United States Army Air Forces pilots of World War II
United States Army Air Forces officers
Puerto Rico National Guard personnel